Brawley Union High School District  is a public school district based in Brawley, Imperial County, California. 

It serves a section of the Imperial Valley in the Colorado Desert of Southern California.

External links
Official Brawley Union High School District website

Brawley, California
School districts in Imperial County, California